Antonio Machoni or Antonio Maccioni (1671–1753) was an Italian Jesuit, linguist and cartographer.

1671 births
1753 deaths
People from the Province of South Sardinia
Linguists from Italy